Bruce Hopkins is the name of:
Bruce Hopkins (actor) (born 1955), actor from New Zealand
Bruce Hopkins (rugby league) (1924–2013), Australian rugby league player
Bruce Hopkins (surf lifesaver) (born 1968), lifeguard at Bondi Beach, Sydney